O. aureus may refer to:

Oreochromis aureus, a species of fish also known as the blue tilapia.
Ornithinibacter aureus, a Gram-positive bacterium.
Thomasomys aureus, a species of rodent formerly known as Oryzomys aureus.